Artona walkeri is a species of moth in the family Zygaenidae. It is found on Java and Bali.

The wingspan is about 24 mm.

References

Moths described in 1858
Procridinae
Moths of Indonesia
Moths of Oceania